FC Amur-2010 Blagoveshchensk was a Russian football club from Blagoveshchensk, founded in 2010 and dissolved in 2014.

Its predecessor, FC Amur Blagoveshchensk, played on the second-highest level (Soviet First League and Russian First Division) in 1960-1962, 1992 and 2005. In 1997-2001 the team was called FC Amur-Energiya.

On September 17, 2009 FC Amur was excluded from the Russian Second Division for not coming to two away games. At the time it was 9th in the table with 12 points in 20 games. The club was officially dissolved. In 2010, a new club called FC Amur-2010, independent from the old bankrupt one, was established. It advanced to the Russian Second Division for the 2011 season. After the 2013-14 season, FC Amur-2010 was also dissolved.

References

Association football clubs established in 2010
Defunct football clubs in Russia
Sport in Blagoveshchensk
2010 establishments in Russia
Association football clubs disestablished in 2014
2014 disestablishments in Russia